Coleophora superlonga is a moth of the family Coleophoridae. It is found in Ukraine and southern Russia.

The larvae feed on Suaeda altissima, Suaeda microphylla, Salsola soda and Kochia prostrata. They feed on the generative organs of their host plant.

References

superlonga
Moths of Europe
Moths described in 1989